Strunde is a river of North Rhine-Westphalia, Germany. It flows through Bergisch Gladbach, and joins the Flehbach or Faulbach near Cologne-Buchheim.

See also
List of rivers of North Rhine-Westphalia

References

Rivers of North Rhine-Westphalia
Rivers of Germany